Walter Loomis Sessions (October 4, 1820 in Brandon, Rutland County, Vermont – May 27, 1896 in Panama, Chautauqua County, New York) was an American lawyer and politician from New York.

Life
The family removed to Chautauqua County. He attended the common schools and Westfield Academy. Then he studied law, was admitted to the bar in 1849, and commenced practice in Panama.

He was a member of the New York State Assembly in 1853 and 1854; and was one of the Managers at the Impeachment trial of Canal Commissioner John C. Mather in 1853.

Sessions was a member of the New York State Senate (32nd D.) in 1860, 1861; Supervisor of the Town of Harmony in 1863 and 1864; and again a member of the State Senate in 1866 and 1867.

Sessions was elected as a Republican to the 42nd and 43rd United States Congresses, holding office from March 4, 1871, to March 3, 1875. Afterwards he resumed the practice of law.

Sessions was elected to the 49th United States Congress, holding office from March 4, 1885, to March 3, 1887. Afterwards he resumed the practice of law in Jamestown and Panama. He was appointed Commissioner of the State of New York to the World's Columbian Exposition at Chicago, Illinois, in 1893.

He was buried at the Forest Hill Cemetery.

State Senator Loren B. Sessions (1827–1897) was his brother.

Sources

 History of Harmony, NY transcribed from History of Chautauqua County, New York and Its People by John P. Downs & Fenwick Y. Hedley (1921), at Ray's Place

1820 births
1896 deaths
Members of the New York State Assembly
New York (state) state senators
People from Brandon, Vermont
People from Harmony, New York
Town supervisors in New York (state)
New York (state) Whigs
Republican Party members of the United States House of Representatives from New York (state)
19th-century American politicians